"The Sun Always Shines on T.V." is a song by Norwegian band A-ha, released as the third single from their debut studio album, Hunting High and Low (1985). The song was written by guitarist Pål Waaktaar. In some commercial markets the single was not as popular as their previous (debut) single "Take On Me", which had achieved the top spot in the United States and several other countries around the world, but in the United Kingdom and Ireland it improved upon the number-two charting of "Take On Me", reaching number one on the UK Singles Chart for two weeks in January 1986, having been released there on 16 December 1985. Its success secured for the band the prestige of having achieved number-one single status in both the primary Anglo-American popular music charts on either side of the Atlantic.

The song was re-released by the band as a live version in 2003 with some minor success in Eastern Europe. It has sold over five million copies worldwide.

Origin and recording
The band's Paul Waaktaar-Savoy said, … we wrote "The Sun Always Shines On T.V.," that Andrew Wickham's secretary felt was a hit. She convinced him to make room for it. When we recorded it, we were really sick with influenza. Magne and Morten were lying in the studio on camping beds with high fevers.

The bass line for the song was performed using a Yamaha DX7. Other synthesizers include PPG Wave, Roland Juno-60 and sampled instruments. The oboe during the song was played on a sampler.

Release and reception
"The Sun Always Shines on T.V." was released in autumn 1985, becoming the second successful single from Hunting High and Low and one of the band's most recognisable and popular songs. The song peaked at number 20 on the Billboard Hot 100 chart. It also went Top 5 in Germany, Sweden, the Netherlands, as well as in the band's home country of Norway. The single reached number one in Ireland and on the UK Singles Chart which was a higher chart position there than for "Take On Me".

Tim DeGravine of AllMusic later wrote of the song, "The Sun Always Shines on T.V." is just as thrilling [as "Take on Me"]. Starting as a sad ballad, it explodes into something much more, as chugging guitars and operatic synths keep pace with Harket's evocative vocal stylings. If ever a 1980s song qualified as Wall of Sound, "The Sun Always Shines on T.V." would be it.

There are two versions of the extended mix. The first UK release is 7:09, it starts with a slow piano intro, while the second one is the commonly known remix by Steve Thompson.

Music video 

The music video for "The Sun Always Shines on T.V." was directed by Steve Barron and was shot on location over three days early October 1985 at Udney Hall Gardens and the Victorian Gothic Church of Saint Alban the Martyr, both situated in Teddington, Richmond upon Thames, in England.

The video opens with a short sequence which forms an epilogue to the video for "Take On Me", the band's previous single, continuing with the use of rotoscoped animation. The young lovers (played by Morten Harket and Bunty Bailey), having survived the ordeal of the story in the first video, now face one another in the woods at night. Suddenly the young man begins physically reverting to his original animated state seen in the "Take on Me" video. The young woman, distressed, realizes that he cannot remain in her world. In pain, he flees the scene into the distance back to his comic-book world, and she is left behind. The camera rises away from her and closing credits roll in the style of the end of a Hollywood classic film, stating "The End / A Warner Bros. First National Picture", followed by an animated television graphic which reads "you are watching channel 3" and the A-ha logo.

The main sequence of the video consists of A-ha performing "The Sun Always Shines on T.V.", supplemented by session drummer Lindsay Elliott, and a bass player, inside a Gothic church, filmed mainly in black-and-white with splashes of pastel coloring. Spectating at the performance is a dense crowd throughout the church of bare mannequins, some clothed in formal concert dress holding musical instruments to represent the song's classical instrumentation arrangement. The video ends with A-ha being cut out from the background and becoming a still frame.

The music video for the band's next single, "Train of Thought", would pick up from this cue shot, making a visual and story trilogy of "Take On Me", "The Sun Always Shines on T.V." and itself.

Awards
At the 1986 MTV Video Music Awards, the video won in the categories Best Editing in a Video (editor: David Yardley) and Best Cinematography in a Video (director of photography: Oliver Stapleton). It also received a nomination for Best Art Direction in a Video (art director: Stefan Roman).

Notable live performances
A-ha performed this song at the Nobel Peace Prize concert in 1998 alongside the new song "Summer Moved On".

A live version of "The Sun Always Shines on T.V." was the only single released from the 2003 A-ha album How Can I Sleep with Your Voice in My Head, the music video for it being directed by Pal Waaktaar's wife Lauren Savoy.

Influences
U2 stated that "The Sun Always Shines on T.V." heavily influenced the composition of their 2000 single release, "Beautiful Day". Bono paid tribute to it by combining the two songs together at a concert in Oslo, Norway, in 2005.

The creators of It's Always Sunny in Philadelphia have stated that the name of their show is an indirect reference to this song. Co-creator Glenn Howerton came up with the title It's Always Sunny on T.V. for their original home movie about three vain actors in Los Angeles after listening to Hunting High and Low at the gym. The home movie later evolved into a television pilot with the now-familiar title when the characters were turned into pub owners in Philadelphia.

Track listings
 7-inch single: Warner Bros. / W 8846 United Kingdom
 "The Sun Always Shines on T.V." (7'' Mix a.k.a. Video Version) – 4:45
 "Driftwood" – 3:04

 12-inch single: Warner Bros. / W 8846T United Kingdom
 "The Sun Always Shines on T.V." (U.S. Steve Thompson Dance Mix) – 8:25
 "Driftwood" – 3:04

 12-inch single: Warner Bros. / W 8846(T) United Kingdom
 "The Sun Always Shines on T.V." (Extended Version) – 7:09
 "Driftwood" – 3:04

 7-inch single: Warner Bros. / 9 28846-7 United States
 "The Sun Always Shines on T.V." (7'' Mix a.k.a. Video Version) – 4:45
 "Driftwood" – 3:04

 12-inch single: Warner Bros. / 20410-0 United States
 "The Sun Always Shines on T.V." (U.S. Steve Thompson Dance Mix) – 8:25
 "The Sun Always Shines on T.V." (Instrumental) – 6:38
 "Driftwood" – 3:04

Charts

Weekly charts

Year-end charts

Certifications

MTV Unplugged appearance 
In 2017, A-ha appeared on the television series MTV Unplugged and played and recorded acoustic versions of many of their popular songs for the album MTV Unplugged – Summer Solstice in Giske, Norway, including "The Sun Always Shines on TV" (featuring Ingrid Helene Håvik).

Diva version

Norwegian Eurodance group Diva, consisting of singers Helene Sommer and Elene Nyborg, released their version of "The Sun Always Shines on T.V." in 1994 as their debut single. It reached number nine on the Norwegian singles chart VG-lista and number four on the Norwegian radio chart Ti i skuddet. In 1995, it peaked at number 53 on the UK Singles Chart. A music video was made to promote the song, directed by Lauren Savoy, wife of Paul Waaktaar-Savoy of A-ha. It was banned by Norwegian Broadcasting Corporation NRK; they found the video too controversial. A new video was made for the UK version. This version received remixes from the Perfecto crew (Paul Oakenfold and Steve Osborne).

Critical reception
A reviewer from Music & Media commented, "What happened to Morton Harket's voice? Suddenly you notice it's a girlie cover of the A-ha hit. The vocal arrangements might be similar, but the duo/dance context makes the difference." British magazine Music Week rated it three out of five, adding, "This clubby cover and remix of A-ha's 1985 hit (huge in the duo's native Norway) could well take off here. Pure and peachy Europop." Alan Jones wrote, "Perfecto continues its chart charge with an unlikely remake [...]. You could be forgiven for expecting a storming vocal, but Diva's sweet and soft vocal quality works very well with the muscular, bass-driven Perfecto mixes." James Hamilton from the magazine's RM Dance Update described it as a "breathily cooed and sighed remake". DJ Jon Pleased Wimmin reviewed the song for Muzik and gave it four out of five, declaring it as "a big pop smash for the summer."

Track listings
CD maxi-single
"The Sun Always Shines on TV" (Radio Edit) – 4:58
"The Sun Always Shines on TV" (Long Version) – 6:15

CD maxi-single (remix)
"The Sun Always Shines on TV" (Remix) – 4:58
"The Sun Always Shines on TV" (Club Mix) – 6:15
"The Sun Always Shines on TV" (Original Mix) – 4:58

Charts

Other cover versions

Interactive covered the track in a single released in 1996.
In 2003, Milk Inc. released a cover of the song which charted at No. 2 in the Belgian Dance Chart.
In Strict Confidence covered the song in a single release in 2005.
Norwegian metal band Susperia included a cover on their 2005 EP Devil May Care.
Danish metal band Meridian released a cover in June 2020 from their EP "Taking Cover"

References

1985 songs
1985 singles
1994 debut singles
A-ha songs
Animated music videos
Irish Singles Chart number-one singles
Music videos directed by Steve Barron
Song recordings produced by Alan Tarney
Songs about television
Songs written by Paul Waaktaar-Savoy
UK Singles Chart number-one singles
PolyGram singles
Warner Records singles